Park Kwang-cheol (Hangul: 박광철, Hanja:朴光哲), better known by his Japanese name , is a retired Japanese-born South Korean mixed martial artist and kickboxer, competing in the Featherweight division of Rizin Fighting Federation. He has mostly fought in Shooto, where he was the Shooto Pacific Rim Welterweight Champion, but has also fought in ONE Championship, DREAM, King of the Cage, S-Cup, Cage Force and K-1 HERO'S. Boku is also a former ONE Lightweight World Champion.

Career

Shooto
Boku made his professional debut against Dutch fighter Marc Duncan at Shooto: GIG East 7 on November 26, 2001, and won by submission in the second round. He also won his next two fights, against Takuhito Hida and Mitsuo Matsumoto, before losing to Takaharu Murahama at Shooto: Treasure Hunt 6 on May 5, 2002. He won his next fight against Toniko Junior, but again suffered a setback by losing the following two fights against Mitsuhiro Ishida and Kenichiro Togashi. Boku then had another four fights in Shooto, winning all four, before transferring to K-1 Hero's in 2005. He was the Shooto Pacific Rim Welterweight Champion, but vacated his title when he left for K-1 Hero's.

K-1 HERO'S
Boku's K-1 HERO'S debut came against Brazil's former WEC Lightweight Champion Hermes Franca at HERO'S 3 on September 7, 2005, and he won by majority decision. His next, and last, K-1 HERO'S bout took place on August 5, 2006 at HERO'S 6 against Alexandre Franca Nogueira. He also won this, by unanimous decision. After this, Boku returned to Shooto for one fight, a draw against Kenichiro Togashi at Shooto: Back to Our Roots 1. He then joined Greatest Common Multiple in 2007.

Cage Force
Finland's Jarkko Latomaki was Boku's first opponent in Cage Force. They faced each other at GCM: Cage Force 2 on March 17, 2007, and Boku came away the victor after knocking Latomaki out with an elbow in the first round. He then fought at Cage Force 3, 4 and 5, winning all but one fight which he lost to Artur Oumakhanov. After this, he went into DREAM for one fight. It was a loss to Joachim Hansen at the DREAM Lightweight Grand Prix 2008 Opening Round on March 15, 2008.

Return to Shooto
2009 saw Boku return to Shooto. His first fight was against then-Shooto Lightweight Champion Yusuke Endo in a non-title fight on January 18, and ended in a draw. He then fought Yutaka Ueda, and won, before taking on Endo again in a rematch which was a title-challenge this time. This took place at Revolutionary Exchanges 2 on September 22, and Boku was submitted in the first round. He then took on Yukio Sakaguchi at Revolutionary Exchanges 3 and won by TKO in round 1.

ONE Championship
On September 18 it was announced that Boku had signed with the Singapore-based ONE Championship and would be fighting Zorobabel Moreira for the ONE FC Lightweight Championship at ONE Fighting Championship: Rise of Kings. Boku faced Zorobabel Moreira for the inaugural ONE FC Lightweight Championship on October 6, 2012. Boku managed to endure vicious leg kicks throughout the majority of the fight to eventually earn an upset comeback TKO over Moreira early in the third round.

Boku lost his ONE FC Lightweight Championship to Shinya Aoki at ONE Fighting Championship: Kings and Champions on April 5, 2013. Aoki fought to avenge his Evolve MMA teammate Moreira, and forced Boku to submit at 2:01 during round 2 with a rear-naked choke.

Boku faced Arnaud Lepont at ONE FC 14 on March 14, 2014. He won the fight via TKO in the first round.

Rizin Fighting Federation
On February 24, 2020, it was revealed that Boku had signed with Rizin Fighting Federation. He made his Rizin debut against Jin Aoi at Rizin 23, where lost by unanimous decision. Boku was next scheduled to face Rikuto Shirakawa at Rizin 25. He lost to Shirakawa via third-round technical knockout and subsequently retired from the sport.

Championships and accomplishments
Shooto
Shooto Welterweight Pacific Rim Championship (One time)
ONE Championship
ONE Lightweight World Championship (One time, first)

Personal life
Boku is also a tattoo artist and has a tiger and turtle ship tattooed on his torso. He is a vegan.

A Zainichi Korean originally of ancestral Joseon citizenship, Boku acquired South Korean nationality in 2004.

Mixed martial arts record

|-
| Loss
| align=center| 26–16–2
| Rikuto Shirakawa
| TKO (punches and soccer kick) 
| Rizin 25 – Osaka
| 
| align=center| 3
| align=center| 4:19
| Osaka , Japan
| 
|-
| Loss
| align=center| 26–15–2
| Jin Aoi
| Decision (unanimous)
| Rizin 23
| 
| align=center| 3
| align=center| 5:00
| Yokohama , Japan
| 
|-
| Loss
| align=center| 26–14–2
| Thanh Le 
| KO (punches)
| ONE: Dreams of Gold
| 
| align=center| 1
| align=center| 1:28
| Bangkok , Thailand
| 
|-
|  Loss
| align=center|26–13–2
| Bruno Pucci
| Submission (rear-naked choke)
| ONE: Eternal Glory
| 
| align=center| 1
| align=center| 3:32
| Jakarta, Indonesia
|
|-
|  Loss
| align=center|26–12–2
| Christian Lee
| KO (slam & punches)
| ONE: Warriors of the World
| 
| align=center| 1
| align=center| 3:24
| Bangkok, Thailand
|
|-
| Win
| align=center|26–11–2
| Eric Kelly
| TKO (punches)
| ONE: Kings & Conquerors
| 
| align=center| 3
| align=center| 3:27
| Macau, China
| 
|-
| Win
| align=center|25–11–2
| Timofey Nastyukhin
| TKO (injury)
| ONE: Defending Honor
| 
| align=center| 1
| align=center| 5:00
| Sentosa, Singapore
| 
|-
|  Loss
| align=center|24–11–2
| Jadamba Narantungalag
| Submission (Von Flue choke)
| ONE: Ascent To Power
| 
| align=center| 3
| align=center| 1:27
| Kallang, Singapore
|
|-
|  Win
| align=center|24–10–2
| Vincent Latoel
| TKO (punches and elbows)
| ONE: Tribe of Warriors
| 
| align=center| 2
| align=center| 4:04
| Jakarta, Indonesia
|
|-
|  Win
| align=center|23–10–2
| Major Overall
| TKO (punch)
| ONE: Pride of Lions
| 
| align=center| 2
| align=center| 1:19
| Kallang, Singapore
|
|-
|  Win
| align=center|22–10–2
| Juntaro Ushiku 
| KO (elbows)
| Pancrase 67
| 
| align=center| 2
| align=center| 4:49
| Tokyo, Japan
| Featherweight debut.
|-
|  Loss
| align=center|21–10–2
| Eduard Folayang
| Decision (unanimous)
| ONE FC: Rise of Heroes
| 
| align=center| 3
| align=center| 5:00
| Pasay, Philippines
|
|-
| Win
| align=center| 21–9–2
| Arnaud Lepont
| TKO (punches)
| ONE FC: War of Nations
| 
| align=center| 1
| align=center| 4:06
| Kuala Lampur, Malaysia
| 
|-
| Loss
| align=center| 20–9–2
| Vuyisile Colossa
| Decision (unanimous)
| ONE FC: Champions and Warriors
| 
| align=center| 3
| align=center| 5:00
| Jakarta, Indonesia
| 
|-
| Loss
| align=center| 20–8–2
| Shinya Aoki
| Submission (rear-naked choke)
| ONE FC: Kings and Champions
| 
| align=center| 2
| align=center| 2:01
| Kallang, Singapore
| 
|-
| Win
| align=center| 20–7–2
| Zorobabel Moreira
| TKO (punches)
| ONE FC: Rise of Kings
| 
| align=center| 3
| align=center| 0:31
| Kallang, Singapore
|  
|-
| Win
| align=center| 19–7–2
| Shin Kochiwa
| KO (punch)
| Shooto: 8th Round
| 
| align=center| 1
| align=center| 1:07
| Tokyo, Japan
| 
|-
| Loss
| align=center| 18–7–2
| Kuniyoshi Hironaka
| Decision (unanimous)
| Shooto: Shootor's Legacy 3
| 
| align=center| 3
| align=center| 5:00
| Tokyo, Japan
| For the vacant Shooto Welterweight Championship.
|-
| Win
| align=center| 18–6–2
| Yukinari Tamura
| Decision (unanimous)
| Shooto: Shootor's Legacy 1
| 
| align=center| 3
| align=center| 5:00
| Tokyo, Japan
| 
|-
| Win
| align=center| 17–6–2
| Yoshihiro Koyama
| Decision (unanimous)
| Shooto: The Way of Shooto 3: Like a Tiger, Like a Dragon
| 
| align=center| 3
| align=center| 5:00
| Tokyo, Japan
| 
|-
| Win
| align=center| 16–6–2
| Tony Hervey
| Decision (unanimous)
| KOTC: Toryumon
| 
| align=center| 3
| align=center| 5:00
| Okinawa Prefecture, Japan
| 
|-
| Win
| align=center| 15–6–2
| Yukio Sakaguchi
| KO (punch)
| Shooto: Revolutionary Exchanges 3
| 
| align=center| 1
| align=center| 1:54
| Tokyo, Japan
| 
|-
| Loss
| align=center| 14–6–2
| Yusuke Endo
| Submission (rear-naked choke)
| Shooto: Revolutionary Exchanges 2
| 
| align=center| 1
| align=center| 3:17
| Tokyo, Japan
| For the Shooto Welterweight Championship.
|-
| Win
| align=center| 14–5–2
| Yutaka Ueda
| TKO (punches)
| Shooto: Shooto Tradition Final
| 
| align=center| 1
| align=center| 4:56
| Tokyo, Japan
| 
|-
| Draw
| align=center| 13–5–2
| Yusuke Endo
| Draw
| Shooto: Shooto Tradition 5
| 
| align=center| 3
| align=center| 5:00
| Tokyo, Japan
| 
|-
| Loss
| align=center| 13–5–1
| Joachim Hansen
| Decision (unanimous)
| Dream 1: Lightweight Grand Prix 2008 First Round
| 
| align=center| 2
| align=center| 5:00
| Saitama, Saitama, Japan
| 
|-
| Loss
| align=center| 13–4–1
| Artur Oumakhanov
| Decision (split)
| GCM: Cage Force 5
| 
| align=center| 3
| align=center| 5:00
| Tokyo, Japan
| 
|-
| Win
| align=center| 13–3–1
| Eiji Mitsuoka
| Decision (split)
| GCM: Cage Force 4
| 
| align=center| 3
| align=center| 5:00
| Tokyo, Japan
| 
|-
| Win
| align=center| 12–3–1
| David Gardner
| Decision (unanimous)
| GCM: Cage Force 3
| 
| align=center| 3
| align=center| 5:00
| Tokyo, Japan
| 
|-
| Win
| align=center| 11–3–1
| Jarkko Latomaki
| TKO (elbows)
| GCM: Cage Force 2
| 
| align=center| 1
| align=center| 2:33
| Tokyo, Japan
| 
|-
| Draw
| align=center| 10–3–1
| Kenichiro Togashi
| Draw
| Shooto: Back To Our Roots 1
| 
| align=center| 3
| align=center| 5:00
| Yokohama, Japan
| 
|-
| Win
| align=center| 10–3
| Alexandre Franca Nogueira
| Decision (unanimous)
| HERO'S 6
| 
| align=center| 2
| align=center| 5:00
| Tokyo, Japan
| 
|-
| Win
| align=center| 9–3
| Hermes França
| Decision (majority)
| HERO'S 3
| 
| align=center| 2
| align=center| 5:00
| Tokyo, Japan
| 
|-
| Win
| align=center| 8–3
| Ryan Bow
| Decision (majority)
| Shooto: 1/29 in Korakuen Hall
| 
| align=center| 3
| align=center| 5:00
| Tokyo, Japan
| Won Shooto Pacific Rim Welterweight Championship.
|-
| Win
| align=center| 7-3
| Takaharu Murahama
| Decision (Unanimous)
| Shooto: 9/26 in Kourakuen Hall
| 
| align=center| 3
| align=center| 5:00
| Tokyo, Japan
| 
|-
| Win
| align=center| 6-3
| Kohei Yasumi
| Decision (unanimous)
| Shooto 2004: 1/24 in Korakuen Hall
| 
| align=center| 3
| align=center| 5:00
| Tokyo, Japan
| 
|-
| Win
| align=center| 5–3
| Naoki Matsushita
| TKO (punches)
| Shooto: Gig Central 4
| 
| align=center| 2
| align=center| 1:15
| Nagoya, Japan
| 
|-
| Loss
| align=center| 4–3
| Kenichiro Togashi
| Submission (armbar)
| Shooto 2003: 6/27 in Hiroshima Sun Plaza
| 
| align=center| 1
| align=center| 2:48
| Hiroshima, Japan
| 
|-
| Loss
| align=center| 4–2
| Mitsuhiro Ishida	
| Decision (unanimous)
| Shooto: 2/6 in Kitazawa Town Hall
| 
| align=center| 2
| align=center| 5:00
| Tokyo, Japan
| 
|-
| Win
| align=center| 4–1
| Toniko Junior
| TKO (punches)  
| Shooto: Treasure Hunt 8
| 
| align=center| 1
| align=center| 4:50
| Tokyo, Japan
| 
|-
| Loss
| align=center| 3–1
| Takaharu Murahama
| Submission (kneebar) 
| Shooto: Treasure Hunt 6
| 
| align=center| 2
| align=center| 3:17
| Tokyo, Japan
| 
|-
| Win
| align=center| 3–0
| Mitsuo Matsumoto
| Decision (unanimous)
| Shooto: Treasure Hunt 4
| 
| align=center| 2
| align=center| 5:00
| Tokyo, Japan 
| 
|-
| Win
| align=center| 2–0
| Takuhito Hida
| Decision (unanimous) 
| Shooto: Treasure Hunt 2
| 
| align=center| 2
| align=center| 5:00
| Tokyo, Japan 
| 
|-
| Win
| align=center| 1–0
| Marc Duncan
| Submission (armbar)
| Shooto: Gig East 7
| 
| align=center| 2
| align=center| 3:15
| Tokyo, Japan
|

Kickboxing record

See also
List of current ONE fighters

References

External links

Living people
1977 births
People from Shizuoka (city)
South Korean expatriate sportspeople in Japan
South Korean male mixed martial artists
Lightweight mixed martial artists
Mixed martial artists utilizing karate
Mixed martial artists utilizing Muay Thai
South Korean male kickboxers
Welterweight kickboxers
South Korean male karateka
South Korean Muay Thai practitioners
Zainichi Korean people
Tattoo artists
Wajitsu Keishukai
ONE Championship champions